Brachtenbach is a village in the commune of Wincrange, in northern Luxembourg.  , the village had a population of 244.

Wincrange
Villages in Luxembourg